Merthyr Town Football Club is a Welsh semi-professional football club based in Merthyr Tydfil, currently playing in the , in the seventh tier of the English football league system.

The football club was originally founded as Merthyr Town in 1908 and played in the Football League from 1920 to 1930, but the club folded in 1934 and were replaced by newly formed Merthyr Tydfil F.C. in 1945, until 2010 when the club liquidated once again and reestablished again as Merthyr Town, which was accepted into Division One of the Western League.

History

Early years (1909–1934)

In 1909, Merthyr Town joined the second division of the Southern League, which despite being primarily an English league, contained several other Welsh clubs, notably Cardiff City, Newport County and Swansea Town. After finishing third in 1911–12 the club were promoted to the first division, though they were relegated back to the second division in 1913–14. The Southern League did not operate during the First World War, and when it resumed for the 1919–20 season Merthyr were placed back in the top division.

In the summer of 1920 the Football League expanded with the creation of a new Third Division, which was made up entirely of the First Division of the Southern League from the previous season. Despite having finished second bottom in the season before, usually a relegation place, Merthyr became a new member of the Football League.

In their first season in the Football League, the club had a much better season and finished 8th. This, however, proved to be their most successful league season, and it was followed by a gradual decline: 11th in 1921–2 and 17th in 1922–3. The 1923–4 season saw a slight improvement in league form as they finished 13th, but the major news was their appearance in the final of the Welsh Cup, though they lost 1–0 to Wrexham in a replay after a 2–2 draw.

From then on the club declined further, and finished bottom of the Third Division in 1924–5. Although they finished 14th in 1925–6, in the following seasons the club finished 17th, 21st, 20th and then bottom again, and were eventually voted out of the Football League in 1930. They were replaced by the ill-fated Thames. During their penultimate season in the Football League the club had their best season in the FA Cup, getting past the first round for the only time, before losing to Watford in the second round. The club dropped back into the Southern League, but lasted only four seasons, before ceasing to play in 1934.

Merthyr Tydfil years (1945–2010)
The club reemerged as Merthyr Tydfil F.C., formed in 1945, and joined the Welsh League. In their first season, they finished as runners-up, and joined the Southern League. The club were immensely successful in their first few seasons, winning the championship in 1947–48, 1949–50, 1950–51, 1951–52 and 1953–54. In the 1947–48 championship-winning season, Merthyr only dropped one point at home (against Colchester United) and only lost four games all season. However, despite their success, the club failed to be elected to the English Football League. The 1950–51 season ended with Merthyr winning the Southern League, the Welsh Cup, the Southern League Cup and the Welsh Challenge Cup.

After bouncing between the various Southern League divisions during the 1960s, 1970s and 1980s, the club finally won their sixth championship in 1988–89, making them joint Southern League title record-holders together with Southampton. This time, winning the championship meant promotion to the Football Conference, the fifth level of English football. The club finished ninth in their first two seasons, and then fourth. However, they then went into decline, and were relegated back to the Southern League in 1995, where they remained until reforming in 2010. They should have been relegated a season earlier, but were reprieved when Northern Premier League champions Marine failed to meet the stadium criteria for the league.

The club's best FA Cup performance was reaching the second round, which they managed in 1946–47 (losing 3–1 to Reading), 1954–55 (losing 7–1 to Bradford City), 1973–74 (losing 3–0 to Hendon), 1979–80 (losing 3–1 in a replay with Chesham United) and 1990–91 (losing 5–1 to Woking). The only time the club managed to defeat a Football League club in the FA Cup was in the first round of the 1946–47 cup, when they beat Bristol Rovers 3–1. The club were considerably more successful in the Welsh Cup, which they won on three occasions: 1949 (beating Swansea Town 2–0), 1951 (beating Cardiff City 3–2 in a replay) and 1987 (beating Newport County 1–0 in a replay). In addition, the club finished as runners-up in 1947 and 1952.

After winning the final in 1987, the club were allowed to enter the European Cup Winners' Cup, at a time when English clubs were banned from European competition. In the first round, they were drawn against the Italian club Atalanta. The club managed a win in the first leg at home, beating the Italians 2–1. However, the return leg was lost 2–0, and the club was eliminated from the competition. Historically, the club's biggest rivals are Gloucester City. The two clubs played over 120 times in their history, making it one of the most played Anglo-Welsh derbies in football. In the late 1990s and early 2000s Newport County were local rivals but the teams have not met in the same league for many years.

2010–present
In 2010, Merthyr Tydfil F.C. of the Southern Football League was liquidated. A new club under the name of Merthyr Town was formed and joined the Western Football League. The club used Rhiw Dda’r, shared with Taff's Well A.F.C., as its home ground. Promotion from the First Division to the Premier Division of the Western League was achieved in the first season and the club moved to Penydarren Park for the 2011-12 season. Promotion to the Southern League was achieved in 2012.

The team reached the first round proper of the 2022–23 FA Cup, where they lost 2-0 to Buxton F.C..

Stadium

Throughout Merthyr Town's history, their home venue has been Penydarren Park. The site was once used by the Romans for their local military encampment and during the industrial revolution it became part of the Penydarren House estate. In the latter half of the nineteenth century Penydarren Park was used by the locals as an open recreational for walks, athletic competitions and team sports. It was redeveloped in the 1890s with a cinder running track and a cycling track added to cater for the fad in foot and cycle racing. An early attempt to bring rugby league to Wales, saw local team Merthyr Tydfil RLFC set up at the rival College Ground. This in turn led to the larger Penydarren Park being host to the first touring Australian rugby league side where they faced a Wales XIII in front of a crowd of 6,000.

It was also the home of the town's former club, Merthyr Tydfil F.C. There are plans for Merthyr to move to a new stadium on the edge of the town. The stadium would be part of the new 'Merthyr Village' development and have a capacity of around 12,000. These plans were thrown into doubt by the Welsh Government's rejection of the project in 2007. In July 2011, the newly promoted Merthyr Town FC hosted Welsh Premier League side Llanelli in a pre-season friendly at Penydarren Park, and thereafter took up full-time residency.

Current squad

Management

Honours

League
Welsh Football League
Winners (1): 1930–31
Southern Football League Division Two
Winners (1): 1912
Glamorgan League
Winners (1): 1910–11
Southern Football League Division One South & West
Winners (1): 2014–15
Western Football League Premier Division
Winners (1): 2011–12
Western Football League Division One
Winners (1): 2010–11

Cups
Welsh Cup
Runners-up: (1) 1924
Welsh Football League Cup
Winners (1): 1926
South Wales Cup
Winners (1): 1931
Southern League Cup
Winners (1): 2015–16

See also
:Category:Merthyr Town F.C. players

References

 
Football clubs in Wales
Former English Football League clubs
Southern Football League clubs
Sport in Merthyr Tydfil
Welsh football clubs in English leagues
Association football clubs established in 1909
Association football clubs disestablished in 1934
1909 establishments in Wales
1934 disestablishments in Wales
2010 establishments in Wales
Association football clubs established in 2010
Phoenix clubs (association football)